Little Presents is a 1961 Finnish drama film directed by Jack Witikka. It was entered into the 12th Berlin International Film Festival.

Cast
 Leif Aaltonen
 Aapeli - God (voice) (as Simo Puupponen)
 Kaarlo Halttunen - Clocksmith
 Eija Hämäläinen
 Pia Hattara - Vetterantin Torotea
 Hannes Häyrinen - Manager Palkeinen
 Raili Helander - Liisi
 Pentti Irjala - Caretaker Harakka
 Tea Ista - Vetterantin Klory
 Leo Jokela - Vennu Harakka
 Leevi Kuuranne - Jormalainen
 Irja Kuusla - Tattari's wife
 Heimo Lepistö - Tattari
 Eila Pehkonen - Hilma
 Pekka Pentti - Henry
 Nisse Rainne - Caretaker Kuikka
 Saara Ranin - Vetteranska
 Jouko Rikalainen - Osku
 Leo Riuttu - Friman
 Heikki Savolainen - Photographer Toivakka
 Irma Seikkula - Clocksmith's wife
 Eero Siljamäki - Immu
 Olavi Suhonen
 Tuukka Tanner - Pietari Jormalainen
 Elsa Turakainen - Karoliina
 Henny Valjus - Clocksmith's mother-in-law (as Henny Waljus)
 Reino Valkama - Cloth merchant

References

External links

1961 films
1960s Finnish-language films
1961 drama films
Finnish black-and-white films
Films directed by Jack Witikka